John Grant Albrecht (born May 22, 1966) is an American actor. He has performed on Broadway, film, and television. As a voice actor, he can be heard in animation, commercials, and video games. Albrecht also has worked as a motivational speaker and speechwriter.

Education
Albrecht is a graduate of Carnegie Mellon University.

Career
In film, he has had minor roles in Voodoo Dawn, S.W.A.T. and played Jacques Chirac in the biographical film W.. In television, he has made various guest appearances in Law & Order, Walker, Texas Ranger, Touched by an Angel, Just Shoot Me!, Malcolm in the Middle, The Guardian, ER, Brothers & Sisters, Criminal Minds, In Plain Sight, Rizzoli & Isles, and Notorious. On Broadway, he has performed at Circle in the Square Theatre in a production of The Devil's Disciple, directed by Stephen Porter and The Shadow Box, directed by Jack Hofsiss.

Voice acting
In film, he has performed additional voice over work for The Jungle Book 2, Cowboy Bebop: The Movie, Tom and Jerry: The Fast and the Furry, Dante's Inferno: An Animated Epic, Happy Feet and Hellboy: Blood and Iron. In television, he has done voice work in animated television series such as Oswald, Justice League, All Grown Up!, My Life as a Teenage Robot, Higglytown Heroes and Yukikaze. In video games, he is most notable for voicing Crypto in Destroy All Humans!.

Filmography

Film

Television

Video games

Soundtrack
Destroy All Humans! Path of the Furon (2008) - (performer: "You Got Me, Hun")

Thanks
CinemAbility: The Art of Inclusion (2018) - (special thanks)

Archive Footage
Destroy All Humans (2020) - Crypto (voice)
Destroy All Humans! 2: Reprobed (2022) - Crypto (voice)

References

External links
 

1966 births
Living people
American male film actors
American male television actors
American male stage actors
American male voice actors
American male video game actors
American motivational speakers
American speechwriters
Carnegie Mellon University alumni
Male actors from California
People from Marin County, California
20th-century American male actors
21st-century American male actors